Bitopertin (developmental code names RG1678; RO-4917838) is a glycine reuptake inhibitor which was under development by Roche as an adjunct to antipsychotics for the treatment of persistent negative symptoms or suboptimally controlled positive symptoms associated with schizophrenia. Research into this indication has been largely halted as a result of disappointing trial results.

Bitopertin is a glycine transporter 1 (GlyT1) inhibitor that increases levels of the neurotransmitter glycine by inhibiting its reuptake from the synaptic cleft. Glycine acts as a required co-agonist along with glutamate at N-methyl-D-aspartate (NMDA) receptors. Dysfunction of NMDA receptors may play a key role in the pathogenesis of schizophrenia and modulation of glutamatergic signalling via increased concentrations of glycine in the synaptic cleft may help potentiate NMDA receptor function and improve the symptoms of schizophrenia.

In a phase II proof-of-concept study, patients on bitopertin experienced a significant improvement in the change of the Negative Symptom Factor Score from baseline within 8 weeks (from −4.86 in the placebo group to −6.65 in the treatment group, p<0.05, per-protocol population). In addition, 83% of patients on bitopertin described an improvement of negative symptoms on the CGI-I1 versus 66% on placebo (p<0.05, per-protocol population).

In January 2014, Roche reported that bitopertin failed to meet its endpoints in two phase III trials assessing its efficacy in reducing negative symptoms of schizophrenia. Subsequently, in April 2014, Roche announced that it was discontinuing all except one of its phase III trials of bitopertin for schizophrenia.

See also
 ORG-25935

References

Experimental drugs
Glycine reuptake inhibitors
N-benzoylpiperazines
Trifluoromethyl compounds
Benzosulfones
Organofluorides